Charmoille may refer to:

 France
 Charmoille, Doubs
 Charmoille, Haute-Saône

 Switzerland
 Charmoille, Switzerland